Winston Green (1958/1959 – 14 August 2017) was a People's National Party member of the Parliament of Jamaica for Saint Mary South Eastern. Green was a dental surgeon by profession. He spoke out in favour of letting gay Jamaicans serve in Parliament.

At the time of his death in 2017 Green served on the Jamaican Parliament's Internal and External Affairs Committee. In the past he served as Member of the Public Administration and Appropriations Committee (PAAC).

References

1950s births
2017 deaths
Jamaican dentists
Members of the House of Representatives of Jamaica
People's National Party (Jamaica) politicians
21st-century Jamaican politicians
People from Saint Mary Parish, Jamaica
Year of birth uncertain